Super Beaver (stylized as SUPER BEAVER) is a Japanese rock band formed in 2005. They are best known for their song , which was used as an ending theme (the 9th ending theme for the series) for the fifth season of Naruto Shippuden, their song "Rashisa" (らしさ), which was used as an opening theme for Barakamon in 2014, and their song "Dedicated" (ひたむき) for the sixth season of My Hero Academia in 2022. The band published their first mini-album in 2008 under the indie label Rebelphonic, and it sold fairly well. Their first two mini-albums were sold exclusively at Tower Records.

Band members
  ("Leader") — bass
  ("Bu-yan") — vocals
  ("Yanagi") — guitar, composer
  ("Hiropon") — drums

Discography

Albums

EPs

Singles

See also
 Japanese rock

References

External links
SUPER BEAVER Official Website 

Japanese rock music groups
Sony Music Entertainment Japan artists
Musical groups established in 2005
Musical groups from Tokyo
2005 establishments in Japan